William Clarke Whitford (May 5, 1828 – May 20, 1902) was an American educator, legislator, and pastor of the Seventh Day Baptist Church from Wisconsin.

Biography
Born in Edmeston, New York, Whitford received his degrees from Union College and Union Theological Seminary. He moved to what is now Milton, Wisconsin, where he served as President of Milton College and as pastor of the Seventh Day Baptist Church in Milton. He served in the Wisconsin State Assembly in 1868, sponsoring a bill for woman's suffrage; and was the Superintendent of Public Instruction of Wisconsin 1878–1882. He served on the Wisconsin Board of Regents for Wisconsin normal schools. Whitford also wrote various article about education.

He died in Milton, Wisconsin on May 20, 1902.

Notes

External links
William Clarke Whitford

People from Edmeston, New York
People from Milton, Wisconsin
Members of the Wisconsin State Assembly
Union College (New York) alumni
Union Theological Seminary (New York City) alumni
Milton College faculty
Seventh Day Baptists
Writers from New York (state)
Writers from Wisconsin
Educators from Wisconsin
1828 births
1902 deaths
Superintendents of Public Instruction of Wisconsin
19th-century American politicians